Macrophoma mangiferae is a fungal plant pathogen.

References

External links
 USDA ARS Fungal Database

Botryosphaeriaceae
Fungal plant pathogens and diseases